A by-election was held in Wallis and Futuna's 1st constituency on 15 April 2018. The by-election was called after the Constitutional Council invalidated the election of Napole Polutele, miscellaneous left candidate in the June 2017 legislative elections and member of the UDI, Agir and Independents group in the National Assembly, on 2 February 2018. Sylvain Brial defeated outgoing deputy Polutele in the first round of the by-election on 15 April.

Background 
In the 2017 legislative elections, miscellaneous right candidate Napole Polutele was elected in the first round with 50.24% of the vote against another miscellaneous right candidate, Sylvain Brial, who obtained 46.19% of votes, and Hervé Michel of The Republicans (LR), who secured 3.57% of the vote. Polutele, one of four deputies elected in the first round of the legislative elections, sponsored the candidacy of Emmanuel Macron in the presidential election and announced that he would sit with the presidential majority in the National Assembly; he ultimately joined the Constructives group as a related member, having sat as a member of the Socialist group in the previous legislature.

After the election, Sylvain Brial decided to appeal the result to the Constitutional Council, claiming to have discovered irregularities in electoral lists and proxy votes. On 2 February 2018, the constitutional council ruled to void the election of Polutele. Under article L. 64 of the electoral code, should a voter be unable to sign the electoral roll at a polling station, the signature affixed, as required the third paragraph of article L. 62-1, should read "l'électeur ne peut signer lui-même" ("the voter cannot sign themselves") and be provided by a voter of their choice. However, 36 voters merely inscribed a "single cross" that could not be considered a signature, in addition to one voter unable to sign themselves whose vote was accompanied by the signature of another voter. Furthermore, 21 proxy votes were discarded under article R. 75 of the electoral code, either because no signature was given, or because a cross was provided rather than a signature. Because 57 votes were deducted and Polutele avoided a second round by only 16 votes, the constitutional council invalidated the election, triggering a by-election within three months.

On 2 March 2018, the first round of the by-election was scheduled for 15 April 2018, with a second round on 22 April if no candidate secured a majority of votes in the first round.

After his defeat, Polutele filed an appeal with the constitutional council on 26 April.

2017 election result

2018 by-election result

References

External links 
Results of past legislative by-elections from the Ministry of the Interior 

2018 elections in France
2018
April 2018 events in France
April 2018 events in Oceania
2018 in Wallis and Futuna
Elections in Wallis and Futuna